Caitlin Cunningham (born 17 January 1988, in Melbourne) is an Australian women's basketball player who is currently a Free Agent.
Cunningham previously played in the WNBL for Adelaide Lightning, Dandenong Rangers, Bulleen Boomers (now Melbourne Boomers), Canberra Capitals and the AIS (Australian Institute of Sport). Her position is forward. She also played for the Australian under 19 team at the 2005 World Championships in Tunisia. Cunningham is the older sister of former WNBL player and current AFLW player Tegan Cunningham.

Currently Caitlin spends time away from basketball recording and touring with her band Asylum Sisters and is more actively pursuing a music career, but has not completely given up on basketball and did head to Seattle where she was seen attending practice with the Seattle Redhawks, while on tour with her music group.

She also is an active Video Blogger.  www.frenchfrieswithcaitlin.tumblr.com is a popular underground Melbourne Blog she is the owner of.

Return to Basketball 2015

Caitlin returned to semi-professional basketball in 2015 playing for Waverley Falcons in the Victorian Big V State Championship Women's league. In her first game she had 15 points with 6 of 10 shooting. This included 3 of 4 three-pointers. She did not start, however started in her second game and had 18 points and 10 rebounds in that game. The Waverley Falcons won both games.

Cunningham played in the first five games of the Big V season before again announcing her retirement on social media site Twitter. Cunningham finished her time with the club, averaging the following numbers for her five games in the 2015 Season;

 Points 12.4
 Rebounds 9.8 (3rd Overall in League after Round 5)
 Assists 2.0
Cunningham was shooting at 45.2% including 42.9% 3pt.

Return From Retirement in 2019

Cunningham was back on the basketball court in 2019 after almost a four-year hiatus. She was signed by the QBL side Rockhampton Cyclones for the 2019 season. It is unclear how long Cunningham will stay with the side, and may just be filling in for other players who haven't arrived for the 2019 season. It is not understood what her pay would be, with rumours the club is possibly paying for her flights during this time. 

QBL Season 2019

Cunningham played in Round 1 of the QBL season and was impressive to say the least, in front of a sellout crowd she was able to almost put up a triple-double. She finished the game with 14 points on (50% shooting), 17 rebounds and 7 assists. Rockhampton went on to defeat Gladstone Port City Power by 4 points in Cunningham's first game in almost four years. 

Cunningham played in the first five games of the 2019 season across three rounds with Rockhampton before taking time to assess her basketball future. Many believe the return to basketball was a huge success, with Cunningham averaging a double-double in her games and being a major contributor to the Rockhampton team as they went 4–1 in her five games. Cunningham was sixth overall in field goal percentage among players who had taken 20+ shots, Cunningham was third overall in total offensive rebounds, and 13th overall in rebounds per game after Round 3.  Cunningham averaged the following stats for the 2019 Season;

 Minutes 33.0
 Points 11.4
 FG% 49.06
 Rebounds 10.6
 Assists 3.4
 Blocks 1.0

References
 http://www.foxsportspulse.com/team_info.cgi?action=PSTATS&pID=186973085&client=1-913-15138-346552-22078720

External links
 http://bigv.com.au/fileadmin/user_upload/Documents/2012/Overtime/JuneOTFinal4_01.pdf
https://web.archive.org/web/20090220190718/http://starnewsgroup.com.au/story/70236
https://web.archive.org/web/20080815091420/http://www.canberratimes.com.au/news/local/sport/basketball/cunningham-takes-time-out-to-find-her-focus/673428.aspx
http://www.canberratimes.com.au/news/local/sport/basketball/breaking-new-ground/1361358.aspx
 http://www.adelaidenow.com.au/sport/basketball/sister-act-picture-perfect/story-e6frect3-1225952039273
 https://web.archive.org/web/20120215121717/http://www.starnewsgroup.com.au/mail/mountain-views/180/story/70236.html

1988 births
Living people
Australian women's basketball players
Canberra Capitals players
Australian Institute of Sport basketball (WNBL) players
Dandenong Rangers players
Melbourne Boomers players